The 1998 Swindon Borough Council election took place on 7 May 1998 to elect members of Swindon Unitary Council in Wiltshire, England. One third of the council was up for election and the Labour party stayed in overall control of the council.

After the election, the composition of the council was
Labour 40
Liberal Democrat 9
Conservative 5

Election result
Overall turnout in the election was 25%.

References

1998 English local elections
1998
1990s in Wiltshire